Tswe (Ꚏ ꚏ; italics: Ꚏ ꚏ) is a letter of the Cyrillic script. It is drawn by adding a long tail to the bottom of the letter tse (Ц ц Ц ц).

Tswe is used in an old orthography of the Abkhaz language, where it represents the labialized aspirated voiceless alveolo-palatal affricate . It corresponds to Цә.

Computing codes

See also 
Ц ц : Cyrillic letter Tse
Cyrillic characters in Unicode

Cyrillic letters